Xinca may refer to:
 Xinca people — an indigenous people in southern Guatemala
 Xincan languages — their indigenous Mesoamerican languages

Xinka refers to:
 Xinka, Somalia, a town in the Uur Caleed area of Somalia

See also 
 Shinca (disambiguation) 
 Shinka (disambiguation)
 Chinka (disambiguation)